Café Teatret is a theater in Copenhagen, Denmark that was established in 1972. It is located in Skindergade. The company stages new Danish plays as well as Danish premieres of foreign plays. One season usually sees between four and eight productions.

Apart from the theater itself there's Café Teatret Kafcafeen which presents its own independent program with one-night events, including debate meetings.

In 2011, Christian Lollike joined as Artistic Director with the ambition to create contemporary performing arts and a theatre with an international outreach. Since then, the theatre has undergone a major artistic change and has become significantly noticed both home and abroad. 

In May 2014, the theatre changed name to Sort/Hvid, but only half a year later there was a fire in the historic theatre in Skindergade, and the building was damaged for good. Sort/Hvid is now located in a new and larger theatre in the Meatpacking Districts in the heart of Vesterbro, Copenhagen, which opened in 2017.

The company gained international attention and controversy in January 2012 when it announced its plans to stage a play based on the manifesto by Anders Behring Breivik written by Christian Lollike. The play, Manifesto 2083 premiered on 15 October 2012 and was performed to 16 November and again in January 2013, as well as in Oslo and at other venues. 

The play was awarded the jury's special prize during the Reumert of the Year awards in 2013. At the same awards, the company's play "Slakten" (The Family) got the prize for best play of the year and Christian Lollike got the best playwright of the year award.

References

External links
 Café Teatret home page

Theatres in Copenhagen